UE Red Warriors refer to the collegiate men's varsity teams of the University of the East. The women's collegiate varsity teams are called the UE Lady Warriors. The Athletic director of the University of the East is Rodrigo M. Roque.

Background
The University of the East is one of eight schools participating in the University Athletic Association of the Philippines. The UE Red Warriors teams have won UAAP championships in basketball, volleyball, fencing, table tennis and other sports. UE athletes also participate in other intercollegiate tournaments as well as invitational tournaments abroad.

Sports

Basketball
As of 2006, The Red Warriors were tied with the University of Santo Tomas as the second most successful team in UAAP men's basketball, with 18 titles, most of them coming from the time of coach Baby Dalupan and Robert Jaworski.

The UE Red Warriors holds the longest senior basketball championship run with seven straight UAAP titles. They also hold the longest finals streak appearances, with sixteen straight from 1957 to 1972. The team has also represented the country at the 1967 Summer Universiade.

UE also participates in the Father Martin Cup and Philippine Collegiate Champions League (PCCL) men's (and women's) basketball tournaments. The UE Red Warriors were crowned as champions of the 2006 Philippine Collegiate Champions League. They are also the 2013 FilOil/Flying V-Hanes Preseason Cup champions.

Pre UAAP season highlights
Champion - 2013 FilOil Flying V Hanes Premier Cup: The Red Warriors won the 2013 FilOil Flying V Hanes Premier Cup.
 10th Fr. Martin Division Cup: The team won the 10th Father Martin Division 2 Cup at the Trinity University of Asia in Quezon City.

UAAP seasons highlights
 UAAP Season 69: The team ended UAAP Season 69 (2006–07) in third place after failing to win their knockout match against University of Santo Tomas on September 21, 2006. They lost to the UST Growling Tigers by one point, 81–82.
 UAAP Season 70: The team ended it Finals-appearance drought in Season 70 (2007–08), finishing 14–0 sweep in elimination rounds and winning their games by at at least 16 points. The team, however, lost the best-of-three Finals series to the De La Salle Green Archers 2–0.
 UAAP Season 72: On January 12, 2009, Lawrence Chongson replaced Dindo Pumaren as the team's head coach. the team participated in five tournaments, two of which were held abroad: the 2009 Ming Dao International Basketball Tournament held in March in Taipei, Taiwan; the Easter Showcase in Las Vegas, USA in April; the 2009 FilOil Flying V Pre-Season MVP Invitational Cup held at the FilOil Flying V Arena in San Juan; the PBL Flex Unity Cup (with the players comprising the "Cobra Energy Drink Warriors"). In the semi finals of Season 72, The team defeated the Far Eastern University (FEU) Tamaraws to earn a slot in the finals, but lost to the Ateneo Blue Eagles in the Finals in three games.

UAAP Season 85 (S.Y. 2022–23) Team Rosters

University of the East Basketball Team

Red Warriors basketball team recruits class of 2020

Notable players
Red Warriors
 James Yap 
 Paul Artadi
 Mark Borboran 
 Allan Caidic 
 KG Canaleta 
 Jojo Mariquit
 Dong Manalo 
 Jerry Codiñera 
 Rudy Distrito 
 Elmer Espiritu
Jolly Escobar 
 Robert Jaworski 
 Paul Lee 
 Xian Lim 
 Charles Mammie
 Jimmy Mariano 
 James Martinez 
Derrick Pumaren
 Bong Ravena
 Roi Sumang
 Rino Magsalin
 Ronald Tubid 
Tito Varela
 Marcy Arellano
 Alex Diakhite

Coaching history
 Seasons 6771: Dindo Pumaren 
 Seasons 7273: Lawrence Chongson
 Seasons 7475: Jerry Codiñera
 Seasons 7576: Boyzie Zamar 
 Seasons 7780: Derrick Pumaren
 Season 81: Joe Silva 
 Season 82: Bong Tan
 Season 83Present: Jack Santiago

Notable coaches
Virgilio "Baby" Dalupan - "The Maestro", Coach of the Red Warriors that gave them seven straight UAAP senior basketball titles, the longest championship streak in the UAAP. Grandslam coach in the Philippine Basketball Association
Jaime "Jimmy" Mariano

Volleyball
The volleyball team won championships in Seasons 78, 79 and 80, but in Season 81 finished in 7th place.

Notable players
Lady Red Warriors
 Suzanne Roces - a product of UEWVT. She was awarded as a Rookie of the Year in the UAAP. She also won three MVP awards and one Best Blocker award in the Shakey's V-League.
 Kathleen Faith Arado — member of the Philippines women's national volleyball team. She also won Rookie of the Year, Best Digger, Best Receiver, and Best Libero awards in the UAAP. She is a two-time Best Libero in the semi-professional league, Philippine Super Liga.
 Laizah Ann Bendong — awarded as UAAP Season 81 Best setter, 2018 PSL Collegiate Grand Slam Conference Best Setter
 Ma. Shaya Adorador — awarded as 2019 PSL Invitational Cup 2nd Best Outside Hitter.
 Mary Anne Mendrez - awarded as 2018 PSL Collegiate Grand Slam Conference 2nd Best Outside Hitter and was a member of the Philippines women's under-19 national volleyball team.

Fencing
UAAP Season 69 Champions: The men's and women's teams retained their titles at the 69th UAAP season's fencing competition, held at the Ateneo Blue Eagle Gym in Quezon City last February 10 and 11.
UAAP Season 75 Champions: The men's and women's teams won the UAAP Season 75 fencing tournament at the Philsports Arena.

Notable athletes
 Rolando Canlas — Fencing master SEA Games gold medalist
 Mercedito Manipol — Middle distance champion
 Nelson Mariano II — RP Fifth Chess Grand Master
 Roel Ramirez — Gymnast champion SEA Games gold medalist
 Bong Ravena - Former PBA player and Coach
 Mean Mendrez — Volleyball player

International competition
The UE Red Warriors participated as the Philippines' representative for men's basketball at the 1967 Summer Universiade in Tokyo, Japan.

Eleven UE athletes were medalists in their respective sports at the recently concluded Southeast Asian Games. These 11 UE athletes were part of the 620 athletes comprising Team Philippines that competed at the 24th Southeast Asian Games in Nakhon, Ratchasima, Thailand on December 6–15, 2007.

Number of championships
See UE Junior Warriors for UE Junior Championships

Second most basketball championships overall
Second most victories in seniors basketball tournaments

UAAP rankings
See UE Junior Warriors for UE Junior Division Rankings

Seniors Division
These are the rankings of the University in the UAAP events it is participating since 1986, the year the UAAP became an eight member-school league.

See also
UE Junior Warriors

References

University of the East
Ubelt

External links
University of the East

University of the East
University of the East Red Warriors
College sports teams in Metro Manila
Spikers' Turf